The 2018 World Weightlifting Championships were held in Ashgabat, Turkmenistan from 1 to 10 November 2018. The logo of IWF World Championships 2018 has consisted of abstract illustration of weightlifting athlete designed by Ashgabat based design firm, Belli Creative Studio

This was the first World Championship, after the IWF changed their weight classes and nullified all world records. As a result this World Championship saw a total of 31 senior men's world records set, and 41 senior women's world records set.

Medal summary

Men

Women

Medal table
Ranking by Big (Total result) medals
 

Ranking by all medals: Big (Total result) and Small (Snatch and Clean & Jerk)

Team ranking

Men

Women

Participating nations
A total of 582 competitors from 85 nations participated.

 (5)
 (2)
 (8)
 (5)
 (1)
 (7)
 (1)
 (16)
 (2)
 (4)
 (8)
 (13)
 (4)
 (20)
 (12)
 (13)
 (1)
 (3)
 (8)
 (9)
 (7)
 (10)
 (5)
 (1)
 (9)
 (5)
 (7)
 (11)
 (2)
 (8)
 (3)
 (3)
 (3)
 (5)
 (10)
 (8)
 (5)
 (1)
 (6)
 (10)
 (20)
 (20)
 (2)
 (4)
 (1)
 (6)
 (1)
 (1)
 (19)
 (4)
 (4)
 (2)
 (5)
 (12)
 (3)
 (2)
 (5)
 (9)
 (8)
 (1)
 (4)
 (20)
 (1)
 (5)
 (2)
 (2)
 (8)
 (1)
 (6)
 (19)
 (12)
 (3)
 (2)
 (19)
 (2)
 (2)
 (17)
 (8)
 (10)
 (1)
 (20)
 (1)
 (12)
 (10)
 (5)

References

External links
Official website 
Official Broadcast Page
IWF website
Results book

 
2018
World Weightlifting Championships
World Weightlifting Championships
World Weightlifting Championships
Sport in Ashgabat
World Weightlifting Championships
21st century in Ashgabat